John Size (born 10 July 1954) is one of the most successful racehorse trainers in Hong Kong history and was inducted into the Australian Racing Hall Of Fame in 2018. After a successful career in his native Australia, Size arrived in Hong Kong for the 2001-02 season with a reputation for rejuvenating horses set back by illness or injury and for his ability to mould and develop young horses from the beginning of their careers. In his first season, he trained 58 winners to become only the second trainer ever to win the championship title in his first season. Size subsequently added more championships in 2003, 2004, 2006, 2008, 2010, 2012, 2016, 2017, 2018 and 2019, and shares the record of 11 Hong Kong title wins with another legendary Australian, George Moore. Size holds the record for the number of winners saddled in a Hong Kong season - 95 in 2016-17 and, in the 2017-18 season, broke the Hong Kong record for prizemoney won by his runners with HK$176,441,240. At the end of the 2019-20 season, he had trained 1,257 winners in Hong Kong, ranking him only behind John Moore (1,735) and Tony Cruz (1,294). He lives in Hong Kong with his wife, Coco, and their daughter, Carina.

Significant wins
Stewards' Cup: Electronic Unicorn (2002, 2003), Super Kid (2004), Armada (2007), Glorious Days (2013), Waikuku (2020, 2022).
Champions Mile: Electronic Unicorn (2003), Sight Winner (2009), Contentment (2017).
Chairman's Sprint Prize: Grand Delight (2003), Ivictory (2018), Beat The Clock (2019).
Hong Kong Sprint: Mr Stunning (2017), Beat The Clock (2019).
Hong Kong Mile: Glorious Days (2013).
Centenary Sprint Cup: Grand Delight (2003), D B Pin (2018), Beat the Clock (2019).
Bauhinia Sprint Trophy: Grand Delight (2003), Amazing Kids (2017), Premiere (2018).
Queen's Silver Jubilee Cup: Electronic Unicorn (2004), Contentment (2016).
Queen Elizabeth II Cup: River Dancer (2004).
Champions & Chater Cup: Super Kid (2004).
Hong Kong Derby: Fay Fay (2012), Luger (215), Ping Hai Star (2018).
Hong Kong Classic Mile: Sun Jewellery (2016), Nothingilikemore (2018)
Hong Kong Classic Cup: Unique Jewellery (2009), It Has To Be You (2013), Thunder Fantasy (2015), Sun Jewellery (2016).
George Ryder Stakes: Al Mansour (2000)
AJC Queen Elizabeth Stakes: Georgie Boy (2000)
The Galaxy (ATC): Padstow (2001).
All Aged Stakes: El Mirada (2001).

Performance

References

The Hong Kong Jockey Club

Living people
Australian horse trainers
Hong Kong horse trainers
1954 births